Eureka, Wisconsin in the United States state of Wisconsin may refer to:
 Eureka, Polk County, Wisconsin, a town
 Eureka Center, Wisconsin, an unincorporated community within Eureka, Polk County, Wisconsin
 Eureka, Winnebago County, Wisconsin, an unincorporated community